Aaron Patton (born 6 February 1979) is an English former professional footballer who played in The Football League for Wycombe Wanderers.

References

English footballers
Wycombe Wanderers F.C. players
English Football League players
1979 births
Living people
Hayes F.C. players
Association football defenders